The St. Louis Jane Doe is an unidentified girl who was found murdered in the basement of an abandoned apartment building on February 28, 1983 in St. Louis, Missouri. She has also been nicknamed "Hope", "Precious Hope", and the "Little Jane Doe." The victim was estimated to be between eight and eleven when she was murdered and is believed to have been killed via strangulation. She was raped and decapitated. The brutality of the crime has led to national attention.

The head of the Jane Doe has never been located, hindering dental examination and the possibility of a traditional facial reconstruction.

Discovery
On the afternoon of February 28, 1983, two teenage boys entered an abandoned twenty four-unit red brick building at 5635 Clemens Avenue in St. Louis, Missouri (since demolished) looking for a metal rod they could use on their go-cart; inside, they discovered the headless body of an African-American child in the home's basement. The looters noticed the body after lighting a cigarette, which illuminated it; her body was naked except for a yellow sweater, and had been left lying on her stomach, with the hands bound behind her back with red and white nylon rope.

The victim was initially believed to have been a sex worker until police moved her body and discovered she did not have developed breasts, indicating she had not gone through puberty. Further examination was conducted within the next week.

Investigation

Initial findings
It was concluded by law enforcement that the victim was not killed at the location where she was discovered, as no traces of blood were found by the body. This led to law enforcement to believe blood had been drained from her body elsewhere; her stomach was also empty at the time of her death. The Missouri Botanical Garden performed mold tests on her body which determined she had been killed within five days of her discovery.

The child had been bound at the wrists with a red nylon cord. Her head had been severed cleanly by a large blade, possibly a carving knife. She was between eight and eleven years old and was prepubescent; she had also been raped. She wore only a yellow, long sleeved V-neck sweater and two coats of nail polish on her fingers – both of them shades of red. Her head has never been found, but fingerprints, footprints and DNA information were successfully collected. Ten months after her discovery, with no new leads for investigators, she was buried at Washington Park Cemetery on December 2, 1983.

The child's sweater had previously been sent by law enforcement to a psychic in Florida who wanted to touch it to receive a psychic impression; however, the sweater was never returned, and is presumed to have been lost in the mail.

Four missing girls have been ruled out as the victim, as well as the Northampton County Jane Doe from North Carolina, who was ruled out to be the remaining parts of the body. She was also presumed to have been a victim of Vernon Brown, who had murdered a young girl in a similar manner. Brown was executed in 2005 and never confessed to murdering the Jane Doe, despite efforts made by investigators.

2013 exhumation
Authorities decided to exhume the body in 2013 in order to gather more forensic information about the victim. The remains had been misplaced, along with many other bodies in the Washington Park Cemetery, due to the negligence of cemetery records and were not found until mid June. The remains were located by using camera calibration techniques to determine precisely where a photograph of the casket had been taken on the day of the burial.

Isotope tests on samples of her bones were undertaken to determine the area the victim would have likely lived based on mineral content in her body. According to an article in the St. Louis Post-Dispatch, the test results concluded the girl was likely to have lived her entire life in one of ten southeastern states: Florida, Georgia, Alabama, Mississippi, Louisiana, Arkansas, Texas, Tennessee, or North or South Carolina. However, the National Center for Missing & Exploited Children catalogue entry alternately lists the midwestern–midatlantic states such as Pennsylvania, Ohio, Michigan, Minnesota, Wisconsin, Indiana, or West Virginia.

After the exhumation, the remains were re-interred at Calvary Cemetery in the Garden of Innocents, a section of the cemetery designated for unidentified decedents.

2022 documentary
A documentary on the case entitled Our Precious Hope Revisited: St. Louis' Little Jane Doe was released in September 2022.

See also
List of unsolved murders
The Duchess - similar case in UK involving an older victim

References

External links

1970s births
1983 deaths
1983 murders in the United States
Crimes against children
Female murder victims
Incidents of violence against girls
Murdered African-American people
Murdered American children
People murdered in Missouri
Rapes in the United States
Unidentified American children
Unidentified murder victims in Missouri
Unsolved murders in the United States
Violence against women in the United States
Deaths by strangulation in the United States
1983 in Missouri